Bangladesh Security Printing Press or Bangladesh Nirappotta Mudronaloy is a printing press of the Department of Printing and Publications under the Ministry of Public Administration of Bangladesh. It was established in 1973. It is a highly sensitive KPI-1 (Key Point Installation) government organization that provides important and sensitive security printing materials to the Government of Bangladesh.

See also 
 Bangladesh Government Press
 Government Printing Press
 Bangladesh Bank
 Department of Printing and Publications

References

External links 
 website

19th-century printing companies
1973 establishments in Bangladesh
Government-owned companies of Bangladesh